Jean-Bertrand Aristide (born 15 July 1953) is a Haitian former Salesian priest and politician who became Haiti's first democratically elected president. A proponent of liberation theology, Aristide was appointed to a parish in Port-au-Prince in 1982 after completing his studies to become a priest. He became a focal point for the pro-democracy movement first under Jean-Claude "Baby Doc" Duvalier and then under the military transition regime which followed. He won the 1990–91 Haitian general election, with 67% of the vote. As a priest, he taught liberation theology and, as a president, he attempted to normalize Afro-Creole culture, including Vodou religion, in Haiti.

Aristide was briefly president of Haiti, until a September 1991 military coup. The coup regime collapsed in 1994 under U.S. pressure and threat of force (Operation Uphold Democracy), and Aristide was president again from 1994 to 1996 and from 2001 to 2004. He was ousted in the 2004 coup d'état after right-wing ex-army paramilitary units invaded the country from across the Dominican border. Aristide and many others have alleged that the United States had a role in orchestrating the coup against him. In 2022, numerous Haitian and French officials told The New York Times that France and the United States had effectively overthrown Aristide by pressuring him to step down, however this was denied by James Brendan Foley, U.S. Ambassador to Haiti at the time of the coup.

He was later forced into exile in the Central African Republic and South Africa. He finally returned to Haiti in 2011 after seven years in exile.

Background and church vocation 
Jean-Bertrand Aristide was born into poverty in Port-Salut, Sud on 15 July 1953. His father died three months after Aristide was born, and he later moved to Port-au-Prince with his mother. At age five, Aristide started school with priests of the Salesian order. He was educated at the Collège Notre-Dame in Cap-Haïtien, graduating with honors in 1974. He then took a course of novitiate studies in La Vega, Dominican Republic, before returning to Haiti to study philosophy at the Grand Séminaire Notre Dame and psychology at the State University of Haiti.

After completing his post-graduate studies in 1979, Aristide travelled in Europe, studying in Italy, Greece,   and in the Palestinian town of Beit Jala at the Cremisan Monastery. He returned to Haiti in 1982 for his ordination as a Salesian priest, and was appointed curate of a small parish in Port-au-Prince.

Between 1957 and 1986, Haiti was ruled by the family dictatorships of François "Papa Doc" and Jean-Claude "Baby Doc" Duvalier. The misery endured by Haiti's poor made a deep impression on Aristide himself, and he became an outspoken critic of Duvalierism. Nor did he spare the hierarchy of the country's church, since a 1966 Vatican Concordat granted Duvalier one-time power to appoint Haiti's bishops. An exponent of liberation theology, Aristide denounced Duvalier's regime in one of his earliest sermons. This did not go unnoticed by the regime's top echelons. Under pressure, the provincial delegate of the Salesian Order sent Aristide into three years of exile in Montreal. By 1985, as popular opposition to Duvalier's regime grew, Aristide was back preaching in Haiti. His Easter Week sermon, "A call to holiness", delivered at the cathedral of Port-au-Prince and later broadcast throughout Haiti, proclaimed: "The path of those Haitians who reject the regime is the path of righteousness and love."

Aristide became a leading figure in the Ti Legliz movement, whose name means "little church" in Kreyòl. In September 1985, he was appointed to St. Jean Bosco church, in a poor neighborhood in Port-au-Prince. Struck by the absence of young people in the church, Aristide began to organize youth, sponsoring weekly youth Masses. He founded an orphanage for urban street children in 1986 called Lafanmi Selavi [Family is Life]. Its program sought to be a model of participatory democracy for the children it served. As Aristide became a leading voice for the aspirations of Haiti's dispossessed, he inevitably became a target for attack. He survived at least four assassination attempts. The most widely publicized attempt, the St. Jean Bosco massacre, occurred on 11 September 1988, when over one hundred armed Tontons Macoute wearing red armbands forced their way into St. Jean Bosco as Aristide began Sunday Mass. As army troops and police stood by, the men fired machine guns at the congregation and attacked fleeing parishioners with machetes. Aristide's church was burned to the ground. Thirteen people are reported to have been killed, and 77 wounded. Aristide survived and went into hiding.

Subsequently, Salesian officials ordered Aristide to leave Haiti, but tens of thousands of Haitians protested, blocking his access to the airport. In December 1988, Aristide was expelled from his Salesian order. A statement prepared by the Salesians called the priest's political activities an "incitement to hatred and violence", out of line with his role as a clergyman. Aristide appealed the decision, saying: "The crime of which I stand accused is the crime of preaching food for all men and women." In a January 1988 interview, he said "The solution is revolution, first in the spirit of the Gospel; Jesus could not accept people going hungry. It is a conflict between classes, rich and poor. My role is to preach and organize...." In 1994, Aristide left priesthood, ending years of tension with the church over his criticism of its hierarchy and his espousal of liberation theology. Aristide married Mildred Trouillot, on 20 January 1996, with whom he had two daughters.

First presidency (1991–96) 

Following the violence at the aborted national election of 1987, the 1990 election was approached with caution. Aristide announced his candidacy for the presidency. Following a six-week campaign, during which he dubbed his followers the "" (National Front for Change and Democracy, or FNCD), Aristide was elected president in 1990 with 67% of the vote in what is generally recognized as the first honest election in Haitian history. However, just eight months into his presidency he was overthrown by a bloody military coup. He broke from FNCD and created the Struggling People's Organization (OPL, Organisation Politique "Lavalas") – "the flood" or "torrent" in Kréyòl. The coup d'état overthrowing Aristide occurred on the 200-year anniversary of Bois Caïman, a Vodou ceremony during which Haitians planned the Haitian Revolution of 1791, which the Aristide government had commemorated at the National Palace.

A coup attempt against Aristide had taken place on 6 January, even before his inauguration, when Roger Lafontant, a Tonton Macoute leader under Duvalier, seized the provisional president Ertha Pascal-Trouillot and declared himself president. After large numbers of Aristide supporters filled the streets in protest and Lafontant attempted to declare martial law, the army crushed the incipient coup.

During Aristide's short-lived first period in office, he attempted to carry out substantial reforms, which brought passionate opposition from Haiti's business and military elite. He sought to bring the military under civilian control, retiring the commander in chief of the army Hérard Abraham, initiated investigations of human rights violations, and brought to trial several Tontons Macoute who had not fled the country. He also banned the emigration of many well known Haitians until their bank accounts had been examined. His relationship with the National Assembly soon deteriorated, and he attempted repeatedly to bypass it on judicial, Cabinet and ambassadorial appointments. His nomination of his close friend and political ally, René Préval, as prime minister, provoked severe criticism from political opponents overlooked, and the National Assembly threatened a no-confidence vote against Préval in August 1991. This led to a crowd of at least 2000 at the National Palace, which threatened violence; together with Aristide's failure to explicitly reject mob violence, this permitted the junta, which would topple him, to accuse him of human rights violations.

1991 coup d'état 

In September 1991 the army performed a coup against him (1991 Haitian coup d'état), led by army general Raoul Cédras, who had been promoted by Aristide in June to commander in chief of the army. Aristide was deposed on 29 September 1991, and after several days sent into exile, his life only saved by the intervention of U.S., French and Venezuelan diplomats. In accordance with the requirements of article 149 of the Haitian Constitution, Superior Court justice Joseph Nérette was installed as président provisoire to serve until elections were held within 90 days of Aristide's resignation. However, real power was held by army commander Raoul Cédras. High-ranking members of the Haitian National Intelligence Service (SIN), which had been set up and financed in the 1980s by the U.S. Central Intelligence Agency (CIA) as part of the war on drugs, were involved in the coup, and were reportedly still receiving funding and training from the CIA for intelligence-gathering activities at the time of the coup, but this funding reportedly ended after the coup. The New York Times said that "No evidence suggests that the C.I.A. backed the coup or intentionally undermined President Aristide." However, press reports about possible CIA involvement in Haitian politics before the coup sparked congressional hearings in the United States.

A campaign of terror against Aristide supporters was started by Emmanuel Constant after Aristide was forced out of power. In 1993, Constant, who had been on the CIA's payroll as an informant since 1992, organized the Front for the Advancement and Progress of Haïti (FRAPH), which targeted and killed Aristide supporters.

Aristide spent his exile first in Venezuela and then in the United States, working to develop international support. A United Nations trade embargo during Aristide's exile, intended to force the coup leaders to step down, was a strong blow to Haiti's already weak economy. President George H. W. Bush granted an exemption from the embargo to many U.S. companies doing business in Haiti, and president Bill Clinton extended this exemption.

In addition to this trade with the United States, the coup regime was supported by massive profits from the drug trade thanks to the Haitian military's affiliation with the Cali Cartel; Aristide publicly stated that his own pursuit of arresting drug dealers was one event that prompted the coup by drug-affiliated military officials Raul Cedras and Michel Francois (a claim echoed by his former secretary of State Patrick Elie). Representative John Conyers (D-Michigan) expressed concern that the only U.S. government agency to publicly recognize the Haitian junta's role in drug trafficking was the Drug Enforcement Administration, and that, despite a wealth of evidence provided by the DEA proving the junta's drug connections, the Clinton administration downplayed this factor rather than use it as a hedge against the junta (as the U.S. government had done against Manuel Noriega). Nairn in particular alleged that the CIA's connections to these drug traffickers in the junta not only dated to the creation of SIN, but were ongoing during and after the coup. Nairn's claims are confirmed in part by revelations of Emmanuel Constant regarding the ties of his FRAPH organization to the CIA before and during the coup government.

1994 return 

Following large pro-Aristide demonstrations by Haitian expats (estimated over 60,000 demonstrators in New York City) urging Bill Clinton to deliver on his election promise to return Aristide to Haiti, U.S. and international pressure (including United Nations Security Council Resolution 940 on 31 July 1994), persuaded the military regime to back down and U.S. troops were deployed in the country by President Bill Clinton. On 15 October 1994, the Clinton administration returned Aristide to Haiti to complete his term in office.

Aristide received the 1996 UNESCO Prize for human rights education.

Opposition (1996–2001) 

In late 1996, Aristide broke from the OPL over what he called its "distance from the people" and created a new political party, the Fanmi Lavalas. The OPL, holding the majority in the Sénat and the Chambre des Députés, renamed itself the Organisation du Peuple en Lutte, maintaining the OPL acronym.

Fanmi Lavalas won the 2000 legislative election in May, but a handful of Senate seats were allocated to Lavalas candidates that critics claimed should have had second-round runoffs (as the votes of some smaller parties were eliminated in final vote counts, which had also been done in earlier elections). Critics argue that FL had not achieved a first-round majority for this handful of senate seats. Critics also charge that Fanmi Lavalas controlled the Provisional Election Commission which made the decision, but their criticism is of a vote count technique used prior in Haiti history. Aristide then was elected later that year in the 2000 presidential election, an election boycotted by most opposition political parties, now organised into the Convergence Démocratique. Although the U.S. government claimed that the election turnout was hardly over 10%, international observers saw turnout of around 50%, and at the time, CNN reported a turnout of 60% with over 92% voting for Aristide. The Bush administration in the U.S. and Haitian expatriate opposition leaders in Florida would use the criticism over the election to argue for an embargo on international aid to the Haitian government.

Second presidency (2001–2004) 

In 2003, Aristide called for France, the former colonizer of the country, to pay $21 billion in restitution to Haiti for the 90 million gold francs supplied to France by Haiti in restitution for French property, including enslaved people, that was appropriated in the Haitian rebellion, over the period from 1825 to 1947.

2004 coup d'état 

Between early 2001 and 2004, ex-army paramilitary units conducted an insurgency, killing dozens of Lavalas activists, officials, and civilians, as documented in the book Paramilitarism and the Assault on Democracy in Haiti (Monthly Review, 2012). Based in the Dominican Republic, these units formed connections with narcotics traffickers in the port city of Gonaives and among elite-led organizations opposing Aristide in Port-au-Prince.
In February 2004, the murder of gang leader Amiot Metayer led to retaliatory attacks on police in Gonaives. Amiot's brother, Buteur Metayer, blamed Aristide for the assassination and used this as an argument for supporting the right-wing paramilitary movement known as the National Revolutionary Front for the Liberation of Haiti. The paramilitary campaign was headed by ex-army/police chief and convicted narcotics trafficker Guy Philippe and former FRAPH death squad founder Louis Jodel Chamblain. The rebels soon took control of the North, and eventually laid siege to, and then invaded, the capital. Under disputed circumstances, Aristide was flown out of the country by the U.S. with assistance from Canada and France on 28 February 2004.  Aristide and his bodyguard, Franz Gabriel, stated that he was the victim of a "new coup d'état or modern "kidnapping" by U.S. forces. Mrs. Aristide stated that the personnel who escorted him wore U.S. Special Forces uniforms, but changed into civilian clothes upon boarding the aircraft that was used to remove them from Haiti. Jamaican prime minister P. J. Patterson released a statement saying "we are bound to question whether his resignation was truly voluntary, as it comes after the capture of regions of Haiti by armed insurgents and the failure of the international community to provide the requisite support. The removal of President Aristide in these circumstances sets a dangerous precedent for democratically elected governments anywhere and everywhere, as it promotes the removal of duly elected persons from office by the power of rebel forces."

After Aristide was flown out of Haiti, looters raided his villa. Most barricades were lifted the day after Aristide left as the shooting had stopped; order was maintained by Haitian police, along with armed rebels and local vigilantes. Almost immediately after the Aristide family was transported from Haiti, the prime minister of Jamaica, P. J. Patterson, dispatched a member of parliament, Sharon Hay-Webster, to the Central African Republic. The leadership of that country agreed that Aristide and his family could go to Jamaica. The Aristide family remained on the island for several months until the Jamaican government gained acceptance by the Republic of South Africa for the family to relocate there.

Aristide later claimed that France and the U.S. had a role in what he termed "a kidnapping" that took him from Haiti to South Africa via the Central African Republic. However, authorities said his temporary asylum there had been negotiated by the United States, France and Gabon. On 1 March 2004, U.S. congresswoman Maxine Waters (D-CA), along with Aristide family friend Randall Robinson, reported Aristide had told them that he had been forced to resign and had been abducted from the country by the United States and that he had been held hostage by an armed military guard. According to Waters, Mildred Aristide called her at her home at 6:30 am to inform her "the coup d'etat has been completed", and Jean-Bertrand Aristide said the U.S. embassy in Haiti's chief of staff came to his house to say he would be killed "and a lot of Haitians would be killed" if he refused to resign immediately and said he "has to go now". Aristide's letter, which is described as his resignation, does not actually have Aristide as clearly and officially resigning. Representative Charles Rangel, D-New York, expressed similar words, saying Aristide had told him he was "disappointed that the international community had let him down" and "that he resigned under pressure" – "As a matter of fact, he was very apprehensive for his life. They made it clear that he had to go now or he would be killed." When asked for his response to these statements Colin Powell said that "it might have been better for members of Congress who have heard these stories to ask us about the stories before going public with them so we don't make a difficult situation that much more difficult" and he alleged that Aristide "did not democratically govern or govern well". CARICOM, an organization of Caribbean countries that included Haiti, called for a United Nations investigation into Aristide's removal, but were reportedly pressured by the U.S. and France to drop their request. Some observers suggest the rebellion and removal of Aristide were covertly orchestrated by these two countries and Canada.

In 2022, Thierry Burkard, the French ambassador to Haiti at the time, told the New York Times that France and the United States had "effectively orchestrated "a coup" against Aristide by "forcing him into exile". In response to this, James Brendan Foley, U.S. Ambassador to Haiti at the time of the coup, called these claims untrue, stating that it was never U.S. policy to remove Aristide. He said that Aristide had requested a U.S. rescue and that the decision to "dispatch a plane to carry him to safety" had been agreed upon following night-time discussions at the behest of Aristide.

In a 2006 interview, Aristide claimed the United States reneged on compromises he made with it over the privatization of enterprises to ensure that part of the profits from those enterprises would be distributed to the Haitian population and then "relied on a disinformation campaign" to discredit him.

Exile (2004–11) 

After being cast into exile, in mid-2004 Aristide, his family, and bodyguards were welcomed to South Africa by several cabinet ministers, 20 senior diplomats, and a guard of honor. Receiving a salary from and provided staff by the South African government, Aristide lived with his family in a government villa in Pretoria. In South Africa, Aristide became an honorary research fellow at the University of South Africa, learned Zulu, and, on 25 April 2007, received a doctorate in African languages.

On 21 December 2007, a speech by Aristide marking the new year and Haiti's Independence Day was broadcast, the fourth such speech since his exile; in the speech he criticized the 2006 presidential election in which Préval was elected, describing it as a "selection", in which "the knife of treason was planted" in the back of the Haitian people.

Since the election, some high-ranking members of Lavalas have been targets for violence. Lovinsky Pierre-Antoine, a leading human rights organizer in Haiti and a member of Lavalas, disappeared in August 2007. His whereabouts remain unknown and a news article states: "Like many protesters, he [Wilson Mesilien, coordinator of the pro-Aristide 30 September Foundation] wore a T-shirt demanding the return of foundation leader Lovinsky Pierre-Antoine, a human rights activist and critic of both U.N. and U.S. involvement in Haiti who disappeared in August."

Return to Haiti 
In a 2008 United States embassy cable, former U.S. ambassador to Haiti Janet Sanderson emphasized that: "A premature departure of MINUSTAH would leave the [Haitian] government...vulnerable to...resurgent populist and anti-market economy political forcesreversing gains of the last two years. MINUSTAH is an indispensable tool in realizing core USG [U.S. government] policy interests in Haiti."

At a meeting with U.S. State Department officials on 2 August 2006, former Guatemalan diplomat Edmond Mulet, then chief of MINUSTAH, "urged U.S. legal action against Aristide to prevent the former president from gaining more traction with the Haitian population and returning to Haiti".

At Mulet's request, UN Secretary General Kofi Annan urged South Africa’s president Thabo Mbeki "to ensure that Aristide remained in South Africa".

U.S. ambassador James Foley wrote in a confidential 22 March 2005 cable that an August 2004 poll "showed that Aristide was still the only figure in Haiti with a favorability rating above 50%".

After René Préval, a former ally of Aristide, was elected president of Haiti in 2006, he said it would be possible for Aristide to return to Haiti.

On 16 December 2009, several thousand protesters marched through Port-au-Prince calling for Aristide's return to Haiti, and protesting the exclusion of Aristide's Fanmi Lavalas party from upcoming elections.

On 12 January 2010, Aristide sent his condolences to victims of the earthquake in Haiti just a few hours after it occurred, and stated that he wished to return to help rebuild the country.

On 7 November 2010, in an exclusive interview (the last given before his return to Haiti) with independent reporter Nicolas Rossier in Eurasia Review and the Huffington Post, Aristide declared that the 2010 elections were not inclusive of his party, Fanmi Lavalas, and therefore not fair and free. He also confirmed his wishes to go back to Haiti but stated that he was not allowed to travel out of South Africa.

In February 2011, Aristide announced "I will return to Haiti" within days of the ruling Haitian government removing impediments to him receiving his Haitian passport. On 17 March 2011, Aristide departed for Haiti from his exile in South Africa. U.S. president Barack Obama had asked South African president Jacob Zuma to delay Aristide's departure to prevent him from returning to Haiti before a presidential run-off election scheduled for 20 March. Aristide's party was barred from participating in the election, and the U.S. feared his return could be "destabilizing". On Friday, 18 March 2011, he and his spouse arrived at Port-au-Prince Airport, and were greeted by thousands of supporters. He told the crowd waiting at the airport: "The exclusion of Fanmi Lavalas is the exclusion of the Haitian people. In 1804, the Haitian revolution marked the end of slavery. Today, may the Haitian people end exiles and coups d’état, while peacefully moving from social exclusion to inclusion."

Post-exile (2011–present)
After Aristide returned to Haiti in 2011, he initially abstained from political involvement. However, on 12 September 2014, Aristide was ordered under house arrest by Judge Lamarre Belzaire while under a corruption investigation. Aristide's lawyers and supporters of Fanmi Lavalas questioned the legality of the judge's order under Haitian law as well as the judge's impartiality.

During the elections of 1991 and 2000 of Aristide and the 1995 and 2006 elections of Rene Preval, the turnout of the total voting population hovered at around 60–70%. In the years following the 2010 earthquake, turnout in elections dropped significantly to 20%. During this period, the right-wing rose to power, with mass voter disenfranchisement. In late 2016 Aristide, for the first time in many years, returned to electioneering, touring the country to promote Fanmi Lavalas candidates; the election results (decried by his party as illegitimate) returned to power right-wing forces in the country, with only a 20% voter turnout.

Accomplishments 

Under president Aristide's leadership, the Haitian government implemented many major reforms. These included greatly increasing access to health care and education for the general population, increasing adult literacy and protections for those accused of crimes, improving training for judges, prohibiting human trafficking, disbanding the Haitian military, establishing an improved climate for human rights and civil liberties, doubling the minimum wage, instituting land reform and assistance to small farmers, providing boat construction training to fishermen, establishing a food distribution network to provide low cost food to the poor at below market prices, building low-cost housing, and reducing government corruption.

Achievements in education 
During successive Lavalas administrations, Jean-Bertrand Aristide and René Préval built 195 new primary schools and 104 secondary schools. Prior to Aristide's election in 1990, there were just 34 secondary schools nationwide. Lavalas also provided thousands of scholarships so that children could afford to attend church/private schools. Between 2001 and 2004, the percentage of children enrolled in primary school education rose to 72%, and an estimated 300,000 adults took part in Lavalas sponsored adult literacy campaigns. This helped the adult literacy rate rise from 35% to 55%.

Achievements in health care 

In addition to numerous educational advances, Aristide and Lavalas embarked on an ambitious plan to develop the public primary health care system with Cuban assistance. Since the devastation unleashed by Hurricane Georges in 1998, Cuba entered a humanitarian agreement with Haiti whereby Haitian doctors would be trained in Cuba, and Cuban doctors would work in rural areas. At the time of 2010 Haiti earthquake, 573 doctors had been trained in Cuba.

Despite operating under an aid embargo, the Lavalas administration succeeded in reducing the infant mortality rate as well as reducing the percentage of underweight newborns. A successful AIDS prevention and treatment program was also established, leading the Catholic Institute for International Relations to state: the "incredible feat of slowing the rate of new infections in Haiti has been achieved despite the lack of international aid to the Haitian government, and despite the notable lack of resources faced by those working in the health field".

Disbanding the army and paramilitary units – the Fad'H, Tonton Macoutes, and Attaches 
The Lavalas political project has long been dedicated to promoting a civilian police force and disbanding the long-time tools of elite repression in Haiti which have been the country's brutal military and paramilitary forces. The government under Aristide launched the first trial of paramilitary death squads and successfully jailed many after aired on Haitian public television trials of FAdH  and FRAPH  members involved in massacres of civilians.

Trials were held bringing to justice a handful of wealthy individuals from among Haiti's upper class that had financed paramilitary death squads. These included individuals such as Judy C Roy (who has acknowledged her financing of the FLRN death squads), and others some of whom held close ties with the former dictators Raoul Cedras and Jean-Claude Duvalier.  Reforming the country's security services though posed a constant problem for Lavalas, as the U.S. sought to undermine these reform efforts by seeking to re-insert its rightwing allies into the police force.  The Lavalas government also faced a lack of resources as U.S. officials under the Bush regime between 2000 and 2004 supported a cut off in aid to the government. Meanwhile, the corrupting influence of the narco-trade continued to be present among the police as it had in earlier periods.

WikiLeaks and Aristide 

The release of many documents through WikiLeaks has provided a great deal of insight into how the international community (United States, Canada, France and Brazil) has regarded Aristide, his lasting influence, the coup, and his exile.

November 2004
Dominican president Leonel Fernandez gave a speech in front of other regional leaders in which he said Aristide commanded "great popular support" within Haiti and called for his inclusion in the country's democratic future.

January 2005
USA pressuring South Africa to hold Aristide, or face the loss of potential UN Security Council seat

"Bienvenu later offered to express our shared concerns in Pretoria, perhaps under the pretext that as a country desiring to secure a seat on the UN Security Council, South Africa could not afford to be involved in any way with the destabilization of another country....2 (S) Bienvenu speculated on exactly how Aristide might return, seeing a possible opportunity to hinder him in the logistics of reaching Haiti. If Aristide traveled commercially, Bienvenu reasoned, he would likely need to transit certain countries in order to reach Haiti. Bienvenu suggested a demarche to CARICOM countries by the U.S. and EU to warn them against facilitating any travel or other plans Aristide might have.... Both Bienvenu and Barbier confided that South African mercenaries could be heading towards Haiti, with Bienvenu revealing the GOF had documented evidence that 10 South African citizens had come to Paris and requested Dominican visas between February and the present."

A June 2005 cable states:
"the GOB (Government of Brazil) officials made clear continued Brazilian resolve to keep Aristide from returning to the country or exerting political influence. The GOB had been encouraged by recent South African Government commitments to Brazil that the GSA (Government of South Africa) would not allow Aristide to use his exile there to undertake political efforts."

Fall of 2008:
On Preval's fear Aristide would return to Haiti via Venezuela

President René Préval made reference to these rumors, telling the ambassador that he did not want Aristide "anywhere in the hemisphere". Subsequent to that, he remarked that he was concerned that Aristide would accept the Chávez offer but deflected any discussion of whether Préval himself was prepared to raise the matter with Chávez.

Criticism

Accusations of human rights abuses 

Human Rights Watch accused the Haitian police force under Aristide and his political supporters of attacks on opposition rallies. They also said that the emergence of armed rebels seeking to overthrow Aristide reflected "the failure of the country's democratic institutions and procedures". According to a study by researcher Jeb Sprague, the armed rebel paramilitary units received vital support from a handful of Haitian elites, Dominican governmental sectors, and foreign intelligence. The undermanned Haitian police faced difficulties in repelling cross-border attacks led by the ex-army paramilitary rebels.

Videos surfaced showing a portion of a speech by Aristide on 27 August 1991, occurring just after military personnel and death squad members attempted to assassinate him, in which he says "Don't hesitate to give him what he deserves. What a beautiful tool! What a beautiful instrument! What a beautiful piece of equipment! It's beautiful, yes it's beautiful, it's cute, it's pretty, it has a good smell, wherever you go you want to inhale it." Critics allege that he was endorsing the practice of "necklacing" opposition activists, placing a gasoline-soaked tire around a person's neck and setting the tire ablaze; others argue he was actually speaking about people using the constitution to empower themselves and to defend their country against right-wing death squads. Earlier in the speech he is quoted as saying "Your tool in hand, your instrument in hand, your constitution in hand! Don't hesitate to give him what he deserves. Your equipment in hand, your trowel in hand, your pencil in hand, your Constitution in hand, don't hesitate to give him what he deserves."

Although there were accusations of human rights abuses, the OAS/UN International Civilian Mission in Haiti, known by the French acronym MICIVIH, found that the human rights situation in Haiti improved dramatically following Aristide's return to power in 1994. Amnesty International reported that, after Aristide's departure in 2004, Haiti was "descending into a severe humanitarian and human rights crisis". BBC correspondents say that Aristide is seen as a champion of the poor, and remains popular with many in Haiti. Aristide continues to be among the most important political figures in the country, and is considered by many to be the only really popular, democratically elected leader Haiti has ever had.  Yet his second administration was targeted for destabilization and is remembered as a time of great difficulty of many.

Accusations of corruption 
Some officials have been indicted by a U.S. court.
Companies that allegedly made deals with Aristide's government included IDT, Fusion Telecommunications, and Skytel; critics claim the first two companies had political links to Aristide. AT&T reportedly declined to wire money to "Mont Salem". Aristide's supporters say corruption charges against the former president are a deliberate attempt to keep a popular leader from running in elections.

Views 
In 2000, Aristide published The Eyes of the Heart: Seeking a Path for the Poor in the Age of Globalization, which accused the World Bank and the International Monetary Fund of working on behalf of the world's wealthiest nations rather than in the interest of genuine international development. Aristide called for "a culture of global solidarity" to eliminate poverty as an alternative to the globalization represented by neocolonialism and neoliberalism.

Publications 
 (With Laura Flynn) The Eyes of the Heart: Seeking a Path for the Poor in the Age of Globalization, Common Courage Press, 2000.
 Névrose vétéro-testamentaire, Editions du CIDIHCA, 1994.
 Aristide: An Autobiography, Orbis Books, 1993.
 , Éditions du Seuil, 1992.
 , Editions du CIDIHCA, 1992.
 (With Amy Wilentz) In the Parish of the Poor: Writings from Haiti, Orbis Books, 1990.

Notes

External links

Books
 Peter Hallward Damming the Flood: Haiti and the Politics of Containment, Verso, 2008.
Articles
 Why they had to Crush Aristide Peter Hallward, The Guardian, 4 March 2004.
 The Other Regime Change by Max Blumenthal, Salon magazine, July 2004.
 "6/7: the massacre of the poor that the world ignored: The US cannot accept that the Haitian president it ousted still has support", Naomi Klein, The Guardian, 18 July 2005.
 'The Return': Aristide, Law and Democracy in Haiti, Brian Concannon Jr., Jurist, 26 June 2006.
 Invisible Violence: Murder in Post-Coup Haiti, Jeb Sprague, Fairness and Accuracy in Reporting, July/August 2006.
Websites
 .
 .
 .
 .
 On my return to Haiti..., Jean-Bertrand Aristide, The Guardian, 4 February 2011.
 Aristide and the endless revolution, film by filmmaker Nicolas Rossier which investigates the events leading up to the 2004 coup against Aristide.
 We Will Not Forget: the Achievements of Lavalas in Haiti by Robert Roth and Laura Flynn.

|-

|-

|-

1953 births
Living people
Presidents of Haiti
Catholic socialists
Exiled politicians
Fanmi Lavalas politicians
Haitian Christian socialists
Haitian Roman Catholic priests
Haitian exiles
Haitian revolutionaries
Haitian socialists
Laicized Roman Catholic priests
Leaders ousted by a coup
Liberation theologians
Salesians of Don Bosco
University of South Africa alumni
1990s in Haiti
2000s in Haiti
20th-century Haitian politicians
21st-century Haitian politicians